Oswald is a children's animated television series co-produced by HIT Entertainment and Nickelodeon. The show was created by Dan Yaccarino and developed by Lisa Eve Huberman. The main character is a thoughtful blue octopus named Oswald who lives in an apartment complex.

In the United States, the series premiered on Nickelodeon (as part of its Nick Jr. block) on August 20, 2001. It was also broadcast on Noggin and CBS (during the Nick Jr. on CBS block) in reruns. 26 episodes were produced.

Plot
The series is set in Big City, a colorful world populated by anthropomorphic animals, mythological creatures and humanoid beings. Each episode follows the daily experiences of an anthropomorphic blue octopus named Oswald (voiced by Fred Savage), accompanied by his beloved hot dog-shaped dog, Weenie, and their life in the cheerful and whimsically-designed community of Big City. Commonly, the program concentrates on Oswald's experiences with friends, acquaintances and neighbors, including Henry, a penguin, and Daisy, a flower, among others and his patient methods of coping with or tolerating different situations and dilemmas, along with his thoroughly optimistic outlook on life.

Characters

Main

 Oswald (voiced by Fred Savage in the US dub and Richard Pearce in the UK dub) is the main character (four arms, four legs) who lives in an apartment complex with Henry the Penguin and several other animals including a turtle named Buster. A very gentle, polite and big-hearted anthropomorphic blue octopus, Oswald is always willing to go out of his way to help his friends. His favorite hobbies are playing the piano and singing.
 Weenie (voiced by Debi Derryberry) is Oswald's pet weiner dog. Weenie bears a strong resemblance to a hot dog and only communicates in "bark-speak". Weenie accompanies Oswald everywhere he goes, and her favorite food is vanilla dog biscuits.
 Henry (voiced by David Lander in the US dub and David Holt in the UK dub) is Oswald's downstairs neighbor and best friend. Henry is a creature of habit in every way and usually shuns the idea of trying different things, though he can sometimes be persuaded otherwise. He tries his best to maintain a rigid schedule. He takes care of his extensive spoon collection, he watches "Penguin Patrol" every evening, and he does the Penguin Polka before bedtime. Most of Henry's favorite foods are fish-flavored and he is a proven expert on snow. He has an identical cousin from the frozen north named Louie, and on occasion speaks of an aunt arctica. His motto is "slow and steady". He always takes two (used to be three) marshmallows in his hot cocoa, saying "No more, no less." He also hates getting wet.
 Daisy (voiced by Crystal Scales in the US dub and Mor Leslie in the UK dub) is a tall orange/yellow/green flower. Free-spirited and energetic yet clumsy, Daisy participates in sports and other activities. She is a close friend of both Oswald and Henry, the three of them often go on adventures together. Daisy loves sunflower sundaes, riding her unicycle, has a large leaf collection and loves peppermint tea. Daisy is very excitable and often has to be hushed by Oswald when she speaks too loudly.

Recurring
 Johnny Snowman (voiced by Mel Winkler) is a laid-back snowman who operates an ice cream shop and also has an ice cream truck. Johnny wears a black hat, sports a carrot nose, and has a deep baritone voice. He also has a brother in the frozen north named Phil.
 The Egg Twins are two identical twin eggs, named Egbert (voiced by Daran Norris) and Leo (voiced by J. Grant Albrecht). Leo always responds in conversations with an enthusiastic "Yes, yes!" while Egbert refers to everyone as "old boy".
 Catrina (voiced by Debi Derryberry) is a baby caterpillar that is just learning how to speak. She is the only child of Madame Butterfly. Like other babies, Catrina is highly curious about everything around her, but is always attended by her mom or others to keep her curiosity in check.
 Madame Butterfly (voiced by Laraine Newman in the US dub and Moor Leslie in the UK dub) is the mother of Catrina and the proprietor of the local diner, a favorite lunch stop for Oswald and his friends.

Minor
 Pongo (voiced by Richard Kind) is a large yellow and red dragon with a long, thin, green mustache and is quite similar to the dragons in Chinese culture and folklore. He lives in a Chinese-style home in Big City. In sharp contrast to his otherwise intimidating size, Pongo is very shy and soft-spoken, and known for his occasional clumsiness.
 Buster is a very slow moving turtle living in the same apartment building as Oswald. He appears in several episodes.
 Cactus Polly (voiced by Laraine Newman) is a helpful cactus lady who carries a lasso and talks like a cowboy from the wild west.
 Sammy Starfish (voiced by Tony Orlando) is Oswald's musical idol, Sammy is a jazz singer. Oswald's dream is to play piano for Sammy Starfish, which becomes a reality when Sammy's show comes to Big City and the tickets are all sold out.
 Steve Tree (voiced by Fred Stoller) is a tree that comes to life. Sometimes his pet Woodrow the woodpecker pecks on him, usually on his head.
 Andy Pumpkin (voiced by Eddie Deezen) is Steve's loopy best friend. He is a happy-go-lucky pumpkin person and works at a candy shop. He tends to speak in hyper tones when working in the candy shop.
 Bingette Bunny (voiced by Kathy Najimy) is a ditsy rabbit who runs the gardening store where Oswald buys his tomato plants. She is usually very unhelpful but usually says "Just doing my job!" when Oswald leaves the store. 
 Roderick Robot is a mechanical man with a mechanical cat, Tinsel. Oswald cat-sits for Roderick, and it turns out Tinsel is a very naughty cat.
 Bingo (voiced by Mac Davis) is Big City's barber, a rabbit who also runs a newspaper store from which Henry buys his newspaper. He only talks in the episodes "The Naughty Cat" and "Henry Needs a Haircut".
 Louie (voiced by Michael McKean) is Henry's cousin from the arctic.
 Flippy is a fish who Oswald bought at the pet store but had to give to the Big City Aquarium as the fish grew too large.
 The Paper People are silent humans made of paper who appear in several episodes as cameo characters.
 Woodrow is Steve's pet woodpecker.
 Tinsel is Roderick's mechanical pet cat.
 The Fish are fish who appear in the episode "Going Fishing".
 Maestro Bingo runs a store of various musical instruments and appears in the episodes "Daisy Plays an Instrument" and "Fixing the Piano".

Episodes

Release

Broadcast history
In the United States, Oswald first aired on the Nick Jr. television block on Nickelodeon on August 20, 2001. It was removed from the lineup on May 24, 2005. On April 7, 2003, Oswald started airing on Noggin during its daytime preschool block. Reruns also aired on the 24-hour Nick Jr. channel upon its launch in 2009, but they were removed on March 8, 2013. The show aired briefly on Nick on CBS for one year from September 15, 2001, to September 7, 2002.

The series was added to Paramount+ (at the time CBS All Access) in January 2021.

Home media
Paramount Home Entertainment is the VHS and DVD distributor for the series in the US while HIT Entertainment is the VHS and DVD distributor for the series internationally.

Main releases

Episodes on Nick Jr. compilation DVDs (US only)

Reception
The series received four out of five stars on Common Sense Media.

References

External links
 

2000s American animated television series
2000s British animated television series
2000s American children's television series
2000s British children's television series
2000s Nickelodeon original programming
2001 American television series debuts
2001 British television series debuts
2003 American television series endings
2003 British television series endings
American children's animated adventure television series
American children's animated fantasy television series
American children's animated musical television series
American children's musical television series
American preschool education television series
American television shows based on children's books
Animated television series about mammals
British children's animated adventure television series
British children's animated fantasy television series
British children's animated musical television series
British children's musical television series
British preschool education television series
British television shows based on children's books
Animated preschool education television series
Anthropomorphic molluscs
Fictional octopuses
2000s preschool education television series
English-language television shows
Nick Jr. original programming
Television series by Mattel Creations